Hahon is an Austronesian language of Bougainville, Papua New Guinea.

References

External links 
 ELAR archive of Hahon language documentation materials
 Materials on Hahon are included in the open access Arthur Capell collections (AC2) held by Paradisec.

Northwest Solomonic languages
Languages of Papua New Guinea
Languages of the Autonomous Region of Bougainville